Steve Maaranen (April 14, 1947 – June 16, 2019) was an American cyclist. He competed in the team pursuit at the 1968 Summer Olympics.

References

External links
 

1947 births
2019 deaths
American male cyclists
Olympic cyclists of the United States
Cyclists at the 1968 Summer Olympics
People from Santa Maria, California
Cyclists from California
American track cyclists